Mario F.L. Gaudino MSCE, FEBCTS, FACC, FAHA is an Italian cardiothoracic surgeon who is the Stephen and Suzanne Weiss Professor in Cardiothoracic Surgery (II) of Weill Cornell Medicine and an attending cardiac surgeon at NewYork-Presbyterian Hospital and Weill Cornell Medical Center. He is an expert in coronary revascularization and clinical trialist. He is known for demonstrating that posterior pericardiotomy at the time of cardiac surgery reduced the incidence of post-operative atrial fibrillation and pericardial effusion. He is also the principal investigator for the upcoming multinational ROMA and ROMA-Women trials investigating radial artery grafting in coronary artery bypass grafting. He is also a principal investigator for the upcoming STICH3C trial, comparing coronary artery bypass grafting and percutaneous coronary intervention in patients with low ejection fraction.

Education
Gaudino completed medical school in 1994 at the Catholic University of Rome and completed his residency in cardiac surgery at the same institution in 1999. Following this, he completed a clinical fellowship in cardiac surgery at Hospital San Camillo de Lellis in Rieti and joined the faculty at the Catholic University of Rome in 2000. In 2014, he joined Weill Cornell Medical Center as a aortic surgery fellow for 2 years and joined the faculty at Weill Cornell Medical Center in 2016. In 2017, he was promoted to the role of Stephen and Suzanne Weiss Professor in Cardiothoracic Surgery (II). In 2020, he completed both a MS in clinical epidemiology at Weill Cornell Medical College and his PhD at Maastricht University on the topic of the radial artery in CABG.

Research
Gaudino's research focuses on coronary arterial bypass grafting, aortic and mitral surgery and novel adjunctive procedures in cardiac surgery. Gaudino has published over 600 peer-reviewed publications covering clinical research. Gaudino is also the Assistant Dean for Clinical Trials, Director for the Joint Clinical Trials Office (JCTO), and the Director of Translational and Clinical Research for the Department of Cardiothoracic Surgery at Weill Cornell Medicine. He has published as first and last author in the New England Journal of Medicine, The Lancet and the Journal of the American Medical Association. He was part of the guideline writing committee for the 2021 ACC/AHA Myocardial Revascularization Guidelines. He is also the Chair of the Coronary Artery Surgery Task Force of the European Association for Cardio-thoracic Surgery. He is the author of Technical Aspects of Modern Coronary Artery Bypass Surgery, a textbook published in 2020 along with several book chapters published in various texts.

Gaudino is a deputy editor of Journal of Cardiac Surgery, a senior editor of Annals of Thoracic Surgery and a feature editor of Journal of Thoracic and Cardiovascular Surgery. He also serves on the editorial board of Journal of Cardiothoracic Surgery.

Gaudino has been elected as a Fellow of the American College of Cardiology, the American Heart Association and the European Board of Cardiothoracic Surgery.

See also
John Puskas - cardiac surgeon at Mount Sinai School of Medicine

References

Living people
Italian surgeons
Cornell University faculty
Year of birth missing (living people)